Wenzeslaus of Thun (Tetschen, 13 August 1629 - Passau, 6 January 1673) was a Czech clergyman and bishop for the Roman Catholic Diocese of Passau.

Biography 
Wenzel the son of Johann Sigismund Graf von Thun und Hohenstein and his second wife Anna Margareta von Wolkenstein. 
He was the half-brother of the two Salzburg prince-archbishops Guidobald and Johann Ernst von Thun und Hohenstein.

Wenzeslaus von Thun und Hohenstein was ordained a priest in 1655.

During the city fire of 1662, Wenzeslaus von Thun was the Passau cathedral-provost and, after St. Stephen's Cathedral had been partially destroyed by the flames , advocated building a modern baroque cathedral. To do this, he got the Italian master builder Carlo Lurago from Prague, who was commissioned to build a baroque cathedral, integrating the remains of the Gothic cathedral.

Just two years after the city fire, the only 35-year-old Wenzeslaus, who had previously been a canon in Salzburg and a capitular in Passau, was elected on 27 March 1664 to succeed Karl Joseph of Austria and thus become the new prince-bishop. The episcopal consecration followed on 20 April.

On 10 August 1665 he was also elected Bishop of Gurk.

He dedicated his reign as Prince Bishop of Passau to the reconstruction of the cathedral and the repair of the damage caused by the Thirty Years' War. In addition, a serious quarrel arose between him and the Passau Jesuits, which ultimately even entailed the withdrawal of priestly training for the Jesuits.

Wenzeslaus von Thun was the first bishop to be buried in the newly built bishop's crypt under St. Stephen's Cathedral in Passau. His monument is to the left of the high altar.

References

Sources 
 Roswitha Juffinger, Christoph Brandhuber: Wenzel Graf von Thun (1629-1673). In: Roswitha Juffinger (Hrsg.): Erzbischof Guidobald Graf von Thun 1654–1668. Ein Bauherr für die Zukunft. Residenzgalerie, Salzburg 2008, ISBN 978-3-901443-32-9, Pages 39–42.
 Franz Mader: Tausend Passauer. Biographisches Lexikon zu Passaus Stadtgeschichte. Neue-Presse-Verlags-GmbH, Passau 1995, ISBN 3-924484-98-8. 
 Jakob Obersteiner: Die Bischöfe von Gurk. 1072–1822. Verlag des Geschichtsvereins für Kärnten, Klagenfurt 1969, Pages 392–396.

Thun und Hohenstein
1673 deaths
Czech Roman Catholic bishops
1629 births
Roman Catholic bishops of Passau
Bishops of Gurk